Qaracallı or Karajali may refer to:
Qaracallı, Jabrayil, Azerbaijan
Qaracallı, Khachmaz, Azerbaijan
Qaracallı, Qubadli, Azerbaijan
Qaracallı, Ujar, Azerbaijan